The 2013–14 Kennesaw State Owls men's basketball team represented Kennesaw State University during the 2013–14 NCAA Division I men's basketball season. The Owls, led by third year head coach Lewis Preston, played their home games at the KSU Convocation Center and were members of the Atlantic Sun Conference. They finished the season 6–25, 3–15 in A-Sun play to finish in last place. They failed to qualify for the Atlantic Sun tournament.

Roster

Schedule

|-
!colspan=9 style="background:#000000; color:#FDBB30;"| Exhibition

  
|-
!colspan=9 style="background:#000000; color:#FDBB30;"| Regular season

References

Kennesaw State Owls men's basketball seasons
Kennesaw State